Flamingo tongue may refer to:

The tongue of the flamingo, which was considered a delicacy in Ancient Rome
The flamingo tongue snail (Cyphoma gibbosum), a species of small, brightly colored sea snail